Almost Never is the tenth studio album by experimental music ensemble Biota, released in 1992 by ReR Megacorp. The album focuses compositionally upon three electroacoustic suites for winds, strings, and processed acoustic/ethnic/antique instrumentation ("Burn Daylight" – "Circling These" – "Old Reason Road").

Track listing

Personnel 
Adapted from the Almost Never liner notes.

Biota
 James Gardner – Rhodes piano, tape, flugelhorn
 Tom Katsimpalis – guitar, bass guitar, banjo, ukulele, harmonica, Rhodes piano, pump organ, percussion, cover art, design
 Steve Scholbe – bass clarinet, alto saxophone, guitar, banjo, ukulele, zither, recorder, harmonica, percussion
 William Sharp – hurdy-gurdy, tape, engineering
 Gordon H. Whitlow – harp, Rhodes piano, Estey pump organ, concert (low) whistle
 Larry Wilson – drums

Additional musicians
 Randy Yeates – mbira and steel drums (13)
Production and additional personnel
 Biota – production, mixing, arrangements
 Joan McAninch – mastering
 Richard Pena – recording
 Dirk Vallons – design

Release history

References

External links 
 Almost Never at Discogs (list of releases)

1992 albums
Biota (band) albums
Recommended Records albums